Tibor Székely, born Spitzer, also known by the pseudonym Dénes Molnár (11 April 1908 – 22 January 1945), was a Hungarian writer and publicist.

Life 
As a publicist he worked for Budapesti Hírlap and Pester Lloyd. His shorter novels were published at Új Idők. His main topic was the life of urban citizens. All of his philosophical backed romantic short stories may be categorised to the high standard entertaining literature.

He died as a Labour Serviceman in unclarified circumstances.

Sources 
 
 Magyar életrajzi lexikon 1000–1990, Székely Tibor szócikk
 Dezső Kosztolányi: Írók, festők, tudósok (Volume II. Szépirodalmi Könyvkiadó, Budapest, 1958)

Austro-Hungarian journalists
Writers from Budapest
1908 births
1945 deaths
20th-century journalists
Hungarian civilians killed in World War II
Hungarian World War II forced labourers